Carreras Domingo Pavarotti in Concert (re-released as The Three Tenors in Concert) is a live album by José Carreras, Plácido Domingo and Luciano Pavarotti with conductor Zubin Mehta. The album was recorded on 7 July 1990 in Rome, Italy, as the first Three Tenors concert with the orchestra of the Maggio Musicale Fiorentino and the orchestra of Teatro dell'Opera di Roma on the evening before the 1990 FIFA World Cup Final. It was produced by Gian Carlo Bertelli and Herbert Chappell.

Track listing
The concert is particularly known for the two recordings of "Nessun dorma". The first is sung by Pavarotti alone. The second, the concert encore, includes all three tenors singing individually and then, for the final 'Vincerò!' singing together - conductor Zubin Mehta appeared completely delighted with the effect this had.

Note
Tracks 13–15 are part of a song medley. Tracks 16 and 17 are encores.

Personnel
José Carreras – vocals
Plácido Domingo –  vocals
Luciano Pavarotti –  vocals
Zubin Mehta –  conductor
Maggio Musicale Fiorentino – orchestra
Teatro dell'Opera di Roma – orchestra
Lalo Schifrin –  arranger

Reception
The recording, released on the Decca Classics label, won the Grammy Award for Best Classical Vocal Performance in 1991 at the 33rd Grammy Awards. It is the best-selling classical album of all time and led to a shift in the way the music industry marketed classical recordings.

Impact
This first Three Tenors performance and recording led to thirty-three additional concerts with Carreras, Domingo and Pavarotti, as well as three more live audio and video albums. All were best-sellers.

The unexpected success of the album among general audiences led to a restructuring of the classical music industry into separate "core classical" and "strategic classical" areas. With the latter category, the industry now geared its focus toward reaching new audiences via intense performer-centric marketing strategies.

Charts

Weekly charts

Re-releases

Year-end chart

Sales and certifications

See also
The Three Tenors in Concert 1994
The Three Tenors: Paris 1998
 List of best-selling albums in Brazil
 List of best-selling albums in Spain

References

1990 live albums
1990 classical albums
The Three Tenors albums